This is a list of works by the architect Gordon Adamson.

Adamson